St. Eustatius Church is a parish of the Catholic Church in Oranjestad, Sint Eustatius, the capital of the Caribbean island of St. Eustatius, in the Dutch Caribbean.

It is part of the Catholic Diocese of Willemstad (Dioecesis Gulielmopolitana), based on the island of Curacao. It is very close to two island attractions Fort Oranje and St. Eustatius Historical Museum.

See also
Catholic Church in the Dutch Caribbean

References

Oranjestad, Sint Eustatius
Eustatius Church
Eustatius Church
1910s establishments in Curaçao and Dependencies
1910 establishments in the Dutch Empire
20th-century Roman Catholic church buildings
20th-century Roman Catholic church buildings in the Netherlands